Soft is a Canadian drama film, directed by Joseph Amenta and slated for release in 2022. Amenta's feature debut, the film centres on three young queer friends in Toronto who are revelling in the freedom of their summer break from school, until a missing persons investigation draws them back into reality.

The cast includes Matteus Lunot, Harlow Joy, Zion Matheson, Miyoko Anderson, Krista Morin, Trevor Hayes, David Lafontaine, Matt Willis, Joy Castro, Sochi Fried, Jordan Shore, Peter Bou-Ghannam, River Price-Maenpaa and Jay Yoo.

The film's title was originally announced as Pussy, but was changed to Soft in advance of the premiere. It premiered in the Discovery program at the 2022 Toronto International Film Festival on September 9, 2022.

References

External links
 

2022 films
2022 drama films
2022 LGBT-related films
Canadian drama films
Canadian LGBT-related films
LGBT-related drama films
2022 directorial debut films
2020s Canadian films